Ambositrinae is a subfamily of parasitoid wasps, within Diapriidae. The subfamily was first described by Canadian entomologist Lubomir Masner in 1961. Most species have a Gondwanan distribution, being found in Australia, New Guinea, New Zealand and South America.

Taxonomy

Ambositrinae contains the following genera:

 Acanthobetyla
 Ambositra
 Archaeopria
 Betyla
 Diphoropria
 Gwaihiria
 Maoripria
 Pantolytomyia
 Parabetyla
 Propsilomma
 Zealaptera

References

Parasitica
Parasitic wasps
Diapriidae
Taxa described in 1961
Apocrita subfamilies